Warren Thompson (born August 26, 1956) is an American former professional boxer best known for his successful amateur boxing career.

Amateur career
1983 National AAU Super Heavyweight Champion

Professional career
Nicknamed "Chico", Thompson turned pro in 1985 and was upset by also debuting Mike Hunter. His pro career never picked up from there, and his resume included losses to notable heavyweights James Pritchard, Bruce Seldon, and Henry Akinwande. He retired in 1996 with a record of 5 wins and 10 losses.

Honors
Thompson was a Class of 2006 Inductee into the Maryland Boxing Hall of Fame.

Professional boxing record

|-
|align="center" colspan=8|5 Wins (1 knockout, 4 decisions), 10 Losses (2 knockouts, 8 decisions) 
|-
| align="center" style="border-style: none none solid solid; background: #e3e3e3"|Result
| align="center" style="border-style: none none solid solid; background: #e3e3e3"|Opp Record
| align="center" style="border-style: none none solid solid; background: #e3e3e3"|Opponent
| align="center" style="border-style: none none solid solid; background: #e3e3e3"|Type
| align="center" style="border-style: none none solid solid; background: #e3e3e3"|Round
| align="center" style="border-style: none none solid solid; background: #e3e3e3"|Date
| align="center" style="border-style: none none solid solid; background: #e3e3e3"|Location
| align="center" style="border-style: none none solid solid; background: #e3e3e3"|Notes
|-
|Win
|
|align=left| Mike Whitfield
|UD
|6
|20 Nov 1996
|align=left| Woodlawn, Maryland, U.S.
|align=left|
|-
|Loss
|
|align=left| Sam Hampton
|TKO
|6
|6 Jun 1995
|align=left| Glen Burnie, Maryland, U.S.
|align=left|
|-
|Loss
|
|align=left| Thomas "Top Dawg" Williams
|UD
|6
|4 Nov 1993
|align=left| Glen Burnie, Maryland, U.S.
|align=left|
|-
|Loss
|
|align=left| Derek Isaman
|UD
|4
|20 Jun 1991
|align=left| Atlantic City, New Jersey, U.S.
|align=left|
|-
|Loss
|
|align=left| Adam Fogerty
|PTS
|8
|24 Sep 1990
|align=left| London, England
|align=left|
|-
|Loss
|
|align=left| Henry Akinwande
|PTS
|6
|14 Mar 1990
|align=left| London, England
|align=left|
|-
|Win
|
|align=left| Robert Colay
|UD
|6
|13 Feb 1990
|align=left| Pikesville, Maryland, U.S.
|align=left|
|-
|Loss
|
|align=left| Bruce Seldon
|TKO
|3
|25 Jun 1989
|align=left| Atlantic City, New Jersey, U.S.
|align=left|
|-
|Loss
|
|align=left| Garing Lane
|SD
|4
|7 Dec 1988
|align=left| Glen Burnie, Maryland, U.S.
|align=left|
|-
|Win
|
|align=left| Tommy Smith
|PTS
|4
|26 Aug 1988
|align=left| Bealeton, Virginia, U.S.
|align=left|
|-
|Loss
|
|align=left| Garing Lane
|SD
|4
|20 Jul 1988
|align=left| Glen Burnie, Maryland, U.S.
|align=left|
|-
|Loss
|
|align=left| James Pritchard
|PTS
|6
|31 Oct 1986
|align=left| Atlantic City, New Jersey, U.S.
|align=left|
|-
|Win
|
|align=left| Kelvin Beatty
|TKO
|4
|19 Jun 1986
|align=left| Washington, D.C., U.S.
|align=left|
|-
|Win
|
|align=left| Lynwood Jones
|PTS
|4
|28 Apr 1986
|align=left| Fort Belvoir, Virginia, U.S.
|align=left|
|-
|Loss
|
|align=left| Mike Hunter
|SD
|4
|14 Dec 1985
|align=left| Largo, Maryland, U.S.
|align=left|
|}

External links
 

1956 births
Living people
Boxers from Baltimore
Heavyweight boxers
American male boxers